The 2016 Kerala Sahitya Akademi Award was announced on 21 February 2018. The award is given each year, since 1958, by the Kerala Sahitya Akademi (Kerala Literary Academy), to Malayalam writers for their outstanding books of literary merit.

Winners

References

Kerala Sahitya Akademi Awards
Kerala Sahitya Akademi Awards